Nicole Grohoski is an American cartographer, naturalist, and politician from Maine. She is a Democrat representing District 7 in the Maine Senate. Grohoski was born in Ellsworth, Maine and attended Ellsworth High School, the Maine School of Science and Mathematics, and Middlebury College, earning degrees in chemistry and environmental science. She served two terms in the Maine House of Representatives before running for the Maine Senate in a special election in June 2022. Grohoski was re-elected to Senate District 7 in November 2022 and is currently serving her second term.

Early life and education
Grohoski was raised in Ellsworth, Maine by Jackie Grohoski, a school nurse, and Ed Grohoski, an electrician and veteran of the Vietnam War. Nicole attended Ellsworth High School, the Maine School of Science and Mathematics, and Middlebury College where she received a bachelor's degree in chemistry and environmental studies in 2005.

Political career 
In 2018, Grohoski ran for election to represent District 132 (Ellsworth and Trenton) in the Maine House of Representatives and defeated Republican Mark Remick to win. She was re-elected in 2020. On June 14, 2022, Grohoski won a special election to fill a vacated Senate seat in Maine's Senate District 7 (most of Hancock County) through December 7, 2022. She won re-election to the Maine Senate on November 8, 2022 against Republican Brian Langley.

Personal life
Grohoski lives in Ellsworth and works for a small mapping company. She volunteers with the Green Ellsworth citizens' initiative, is on the Board of Directors for the Northern Forest Canoe Trail, and drives for Meals on Wheels.

Electoral record

References 

Living people
Cartographers
Democratic Party members of the Maine House of Representatives
21st-century American politicians
21st-century American women politicians
People from Ellsworth, Maine
Middlebury College alumni
Year of birth missing (living people)